Fukushima Peak is a high, pointed rocky peak,  high, near the south edge of the ice-covered Vinson Plateau in the Sentinel Range of the Ellsworth Mountains, Antarctica.

The peak was named by the Advisory Committee on Antarctic Names in 2006 after Eiichi Fukushima, a member of the 1966–67 American Antarctic Mountaineering Expedition that made the first ascent of Mount Vinson, the summit of Antarctica, and other high mountains in the Sentinel Range.

Location
US mapping in 1961, updated in 1988.

See also
 Mountains in Antarctica

Maps
 Vinson Massif.  Scale 1:250 000 topographic map.  Reston, Virginia: US Geological Survey, 1988.
 D. Gildea and C. Rada.  Vinson Massif and the Sentinel Range.  Scale 1:50 000 topographic map.  Omega Foundation, 2007.
 Antarctic Digital Database (ADD). Scale 1:250000 topographic map of Antarctica. Scientific Committee on Antarctic Research (SCAR). Since 1993, regularly updated.

References

 Fukushima Peak. SCAR Composite Gazetteer of Antarctica.

Ellsworth Mountains
Mountains of Ellsworth Land
Four-thousanders of Antarctica